Abel Rathbone Corbin (May 24, 1808 – March 28, 1881) was an American newspaper editor, financier, and the husband of Virginia Grant, sister of President Ulysses S. Grant.  In the 1830s, he edited the Missouri Argus of St. Louis, the official Democratic party organ of Missouri.  He was involved in the Black Friday stock market crash of September 24, 1869.

Corbin was born in Otsego, New York to Eliakim Lyon Corbin and Lodama (née Rathbone) Corbin.  He married on May 13, 1869, in Covington, Kentucky, to Virginia Grant as his second wife.  They had one child, Jennie Corbin, who died as an infant.  Abel's first marriage, to Elizabeth (née Lewis) McAllister (1794–1868), also had no surviving issue.  Abel Corbin died in Jersey City, New Jersey.

References 
PBS's American Experience on Black Friday
The Corbin Ancestry of Abel Rathbone Corbin
Genealogy of the family of Ulysses S. Grant
 William H. Lyon, The Pioneer Editor in Missouri 1808–1860 (University of Missouri Press, 1965), 22–23.

1808 births
1881 deaths
People from Otsego, New York
American financiers
Missouri Democrats
19th-century American businesspeople